Kurt Gattinger (1 September 1914 – 13 January 2007) was a Nazi SS-Officer and an Austrian politician.

Early life 
In 1932 Gattinger completed his final exams.

Career

Nazi SS member 
In Berlin in 1934, he joined the Leibstandarte SS, which had been established by Sepp Dietrich in 1933. He took part in the attack on Poland as a member of the SS Regiment "Germany". In 1940, Gattinger was employed in an SS artillery regiment in the western campaign in Normandy. On the Eastern Front, he was chief of an artillery battery of the 5th SS Panzer Division "Wiking". In 1940 he received the Iron Cross as superintendent, and in 1942 as SS-Hauptsturmführer during the fighting in the Elbrusgebiet. In the campaign against the USSR he was the battery commander of the 5th SS Panzer Division Wiking.

Political career
Kurt Gattinger joined the ÖVP-Tirol in 1948 and in 1953 became the Secretary of ÖVP-Tirol. Gattinger was well known for organizing of the "pardon action" for former National Socialists members. Gattinger also founded organizations such as Wohnungseigentum and "Die Brücke". 

His political career ended when, on 27 February 1967, the police showed up in the offices of WE. As managing director, he was suspected of financial infidelity and sentenced two years later.

Awards
 1942 the German Cross in gold
 1980 Order of merit of Tirol

References

1914 births
2007 deaths
20th-century Austrian politicians
Austrian people of World War II
Politicians from Innsbruck
Austrian military personnel of World War II
Military personnel from Innsbruck
Waffen-SS personnel